Rosario Murcia-Gangloff (born 23 September 1964 in Lyon) is a retired French athlete who competed in long-distance events. She represented her country at the 1992 Summer Olympics as well as three outdoor and one indoor World Championships.

Competition record

Personal bests
Outdoor
1500 metres – 4:15.77 (Annecy 1987)
3000 metres – 8:52.20 (Nice 1995)
5000 metres – 15:25.33 (Saint-Denis 1995)
10,000 metres – 31:42.83 (Lommel 1992)
10 kilometres – 36:25 (Dax 2005)
Half marathon – 1:13:24 (Nice 1999)
Marathon – 2:42:32 (Reims 1998)
3000 metres steeplechase – 10:44.54 (Saint-Étienne 2001)
Indoor
3000 metres – 8:56.20 (Seville 1991)

References

All-Athletics profile

1964 births
Living people
Athletes from Lyon
French female long-distance runners
French female marathon runners
French female steeplechase runners
Olympic athletes of France
Athletes (track and field) at the 1992 Summer Olympics
World Athletics Championships athletes for France
Mediterranean Games bronze medalists for France
Mediterranean Games medalists in athletics
Athletes (track and field) at the 1987 Mediterranean Games